Hishū or Hishu may refer to:

 Hishū, another name for Hida Province.

 Hishū, another name for Hi Province.
 Hishū, another name for Hizen Province.
 Hishū, another name for Higo Province.